Lady Tatiana Helen Georgia Dru (née Mountbatten; born 16 April 1990) is an English equestrian.

Biography
Tatiana was born on 16 April 1990 to George Mountbatten, 4th Marquess of Milford Haven and his wife, Sarah Georgina (née Walker). She is an older sister of Henry Mountbatten, Earl of Medina. Her paternal great-grandparents, Prince George of Battenberg and Countess Nadejda Mikhailovna de Torby, were morganatic descendants of German and Russian royal houses. Her great-grandparents gave up their German titles in exchange for titles within the British peerage, and Anglicised their family name from Battenberg to Mountbatten. Through her father, Tatiana is a descendant of Alexander Pushkin, Abram Gannibal and multiple monarchs including Louis II, Grand Duke of Hesse, Louis IV, Grand Duke of Hesse, Nicholas I of Russia, and Queen Victoria. She is a paternal second cousin once removed of Charles III and the first cousin twice removed of Prince Philip, Duke of Edinburgh.

She went to school at Millfield in Street, Somerset. Tatiana is an equestrian and competes at a high level in dressage. She formerly trained under Hasse Hoffamann, Klaus Balkenhol, and Kyra Kyrklund but now trains under Charlotte Dujardin.

In 2007, she was presented to society at Le Bal des Débutantes in Paris. In October 2018, Crofton & Hall appointed Tatiana as their brand ambassador.

In November 2019, Tatiana published a personal website containing an equestrian and country style blog. In December 2019, Tatiana was banned from driving for six months by a Magistrates Court because of speeding-related offences. Tatiana has previously raced in The 2021 Magnolia Cup for a UK Charity.

Her engagement to entrepreneur Alexander 'Alick' Dru, the son of Mr. and Mrs. Bernard Dru and great-great-grandson of Henry Herbert, 4th Earl of Carnarvon, from Bickham, Somerset, was announced in January 2022; the proposal took place during a vacation in Verbier, in the Swiss Alps. The couple married at Winchester Cathedral on 23 July 2022.

Her website and Instagram account state that she is a psychotherapist in training; she wishes to combine her knowledge of horses and somehow incorporate them into her methods of therapy.

References

External links 

1990 births
Living people
Daughters of British marquesses
Tatiana
British debutantes
Debutantes of le Bal des débutantes
English socialites
British dressage riders
Fashion influencers
People educated at Millfield